Kimidi Kalavenkata Rao is an Indian politician and Telugudesam party leader. He was appointed President of the Andhra Pradesh Division of the Telugu Desam Party after the partition of Andhra Pradesh.

Political Life
 Rao joined the Telugu Desam Party in 1983 with the formation of the party. In the 1983, 1985, 1989 and 2004 elections, he won the Unukuru Assembly constituency four times as an MLA on behalf of the Telugu Desam Party. He served as the Minister of Trade Taxes, Municipalities and Home Affairs in the Governments of Telugu Desam.
 Rao served as the Chairman of the Tirumala Tirupati Devasthanam-TTD. He was a Member of the Rajya Sabha from 1998 to 2004. 
 Rao joined the Chiranjeevi-led Prajarajyam Party in the 2009 Assembly elections. When Unukuru constituency was merged with other constituencies in 2009, he contested as a Prajarajyam Party candidate from Echerla Assembly constituency and lost to Congress candidate Meesala Neelakantam Naidu. Though he wanted to come back to Telugudesam party, he could not come due to some reasons. He has not left the Prajarajyam Party since 2012 and has not been active in any political party for 2 years. 
 In the 2014 Assembly elections, he contested and won the Telugu Desam Party candidate from Etcherla Assembly constituency again.

Positions held 

 Municipal Departments, Government of Andhra Pradesh.
 Department of Commercial Taxes, Government of Andhra Pradesh.
 Home Department, Government of Andhra Pradesh.
 Member of the Rajya Sabha.
 Department of Energy Resources, Government of Andhra Pradesh.

References

External links
 Kimidi Kalavenkatarao,కిమిడి కళావెంకటరావు
 Kimidi Kala Venkatarao Takes Oath as AP Cabinet Minister
 

Living people
1952 births
Telugu Desam Party politicians
Rajya Sabha members from Uttar Pradesh
People from Srikakulam district
Rajya Sabha members from Andhra Pradesh
People from Uttarandhra